"Burns' Heir" is the eighteenth episode of the fifth season of the American animated television series The Simpsons. It originally aired on the Fox network in the United States on April 14, 1994. In the episode, Mr. Burns has a near-death experience that prompts him to find an heir to inherit his wealth after he dies. He chooses Bart as his heir because he admires the boy's malevolence. Marge convinces Bart to spend time with his benefactor, who allows his heir the money and freedom to do whatever he pleases. Soon Bart leaves his family to live with Burns instead.

The episode was written by Jace Richdale and directed by Mark Kirkland. "'Burns' Heir'" is Richdale's sole writing credit. David Silverman was originally set to direct the episode, but he was so swamped with his work as supervising director that it was reassigned to Kirkland.

Plot
Mr. Burns almost drowns while taking a bath after Smithers puts a sponge on his head, weighing down his puny body. Realizing that no one will carry on his legacy when he dies, Mr. Burns decides to find an heir to inherit his vast fortune. After years of devotion, Smithers thinks he should inherit his wealth. Burns believes he will receive a "far greater reward" by being buried alive with his boss to which Smithers agrees.

Burns auditions several boys for his heir, including Nelson, Martin, and Milhouse. Bart and Lisa also audition and fail: Burns disqualifies Lisa because she is a girl and Bart because he dislikes the poorly worded proposal Homer makes him read aloud, which isn’t helped by Homer misspelling “Burns” as “Kurns” (and insisting that it is pronounced as such). The audition ends with Burns kicking him in the butt with a mechanical boot, much to Homer’s amusement. Homer then tells both Bart and Lisa to "never try". Bart gets revenge by vandalizing his mansion. Burns is impressed by Bart's malevolence and accepts him as his heir, although he initially liked Nelson for a similar reason.

Homer and Marge sign a legal document that officially names Bart as Burns' heir. Marge suggests that Bart spend time with the lonely old man because he stands to inherit his fortune. Initially repelled by Burns' coldness, Bart warms to him after he promises to give him anything he wants. Soon Bart abandons his family because Burns allows him to do whatever he likes (including getting Krusty the Clown delivering him pizza while his show airs a rerun when Falkland islands were invaded). Bart's parents sue to get their son back, but after they hire Lionel Hutz as their lawyer, the court decides that Burns is "clearly the boy's biological father." The Simpsons hire a deprogrammer to kidnap Bart, but he abducts Hans Moleman by mistake and brainwashes him into thinking he is the Simpsons' son.

When Bart grows lonely and wants to go home, Burns tricks him into thinking his family no longer loves him by staging a fake video with actors portraying the Simpsons. Bart decides that Burns is his true father and they celebrate by randomly firing Springfield Nuclear Power Plant employees by dropping them through a trapdoor. Lenny is the first employee to suffer this fate, having been forced to defend his record as an employee without using the letter "E". When Homer enters the office (through tracking a trail of donuts), Burns tries to completely sever Bart's family ties by forcing him to fire his father. Instead, Bart "fires" Burns by dropping him through the trapdoor. Smithers quickly jumps into the shaft and implores his boss to "land on Leonard's carcass" to cushion his fall. Bart moves home after realizing that he loves his family.

Production

"Burns' Heir" was the first episode in which Jace Richdale received a writers' credit, although he was a part of the show's staff for several seasons. When he was starting out as a writer on the show, Richdale was told to come up with some story ideas and he came up with the basic plot off the top of his head. David Silverman was originally going to direct the episode, but he was so swamped with his work as supervising director that it was reassigned to Mark Kirkland. While the Simpsons are at a movie, there is a parody of the THX sound Deep Note. During that scene, a man's head explodes in a reference to the film Scanners. The THX executives liked the parody so much that the scene was made into an actual THX movie trailer, with the scene being redone for the widescreen aspect ratio.

A deleted scene from the episode sees Mr. Burns release a "Robotic Richard Simmons" as a way of getting rid of Homer, which dances to a recording of K.C. and the Sunshine Band's "Shake Your Booty". Simmons was originally asked to guest star; according to David Mirkin, he was "dying to do the show", but declined when he found out he would voice a robot. It was fully animated, but was cut from "Burns' Heir" because it often did not get a good reaction during table reads. According to Bill Oakley, there was a "significant division of opinion amongst the staff as to whether Richard Simmons was a target The Simpsons should make fun of" because it was "well-trod territory". They also felt it distracted viewers from the story. To the production staff's surprise, the scene would make the audience "erupt with laughter" when screened at animation conventions and college presentations, so they decided to insert it in the season seven clip show "The Simpsons 138th Episode Spectacular".

Reception

Critical reception
The authors of the book I Can't Believe It's a Bigger and Better Updated Unofficial Simpsons Guide, Warren Martyn and Adrian Wood, wrote that, "the episode lacks the emotional punch of others in which members of the family are separated."

DVD Movie Guide's Colin Jacobson wrote that the episode was "such a great concept that it’s a surprise no [one] went for it earlier." He felt that it "occasionally veers on the edge of mushiness, but it avoids becoming too sentimental. It's a blast to see Burns’ world from Bart’s point of view. DVD Talk gave the episode a score of 5 out of 5 while DVD Verdict gave the episode a B.

Paul Campos of Rocky Mountain News described the Robotic Richard Simmons scene as "a level of surreal comedy that approaches a kind of genius".

Homer's quote, "Kids, you tried your best and you failed miserably. The lesson is never try", was added to The Oxford Dictionary of Quotations in August 2007.

Ratings
In its original broadcast, "Burns' Heir" finished 53rd in ratings for the week of April 11–17, 1994, with a Nielsen rating of 9.4, and was viewed in 8.85 million households. The show dropped four places in the rankings after finishing 49th the previous week. It was the third highest rated show on Fox that week following Living Single and Married... with Children.

References

External links

The Simpsons (season 5) episodes
1994 American television episodes